Rolla is a village and mandal in Sri Sathya Sai district of Andhra Pradesh, India.

Geography
It has an average elevation of 726 metres (2385 ft).

Demographics
 Indian census, the demographic details of Rolla mandal is as follows:
 Total Population: 	34,888	in 7,296 Households. 	
 Male Population: 	17,535	and Female Population: 	17,353		
 Children Under 6-years of age: 4,626	(Boys - 2,283 and Girls -	2,343)
 Total Literates: 	15,581

Villages 
The villages in Rolla mandal include: Hulikunta, Jeerige Halli, H.M. Palli, KG Gutta (Kodagari Gutta), HT Halli, Kaluve Halli, Mallinamadugu, G G hatti, Hunisekunta, Keriyalahalli, Hallikere, Mallasandra, TD Halli, Agrahara, Vannaranahalli, Somagatta, Bandrepalli, Bommagundanahalli, Dodderi, Gudduguriki, Kaki, M. Rayapuram, Ratnagiri, Ranganahalli, Rolla, Rolla Konda, Rolla Vadrahatti, Rolla Gollahatti, Kadupula Konda, Thimmarada Palli, Hosur, Naasepalli, Sugaali Thaanda and Somagatta.

References 

Villages in Sri Sathya Sai district
Mandal headquarters in Sri Sathya Sai district